Nasir (born 8 October 1995) is an Indonesian professional footballer who plays for Liga 1 club Dewa United, mainly as a left back but also as a left winger.

Club career

Arema FC
At first he was just following his selection at Arema FC, but when Ahmad Nufiandani joined PS TNI, Nasir also got a place to fill the slot for U-23 players. Nasir could follow the selection in Arema FC because it was recommended by former Arema FC players, Andi Robot. He was able to captivate the attention of the coaching team during the selection.

Persebaya Surabaya
He was signed for Persebaya Surabaya to play in the Liga 1 in the 2020 season. This season was suspended on 27 March 2020 due to the COVID-19 pandemic. The season was abandoned and was declared void on 20 January 2021.

Persela Lamongan
He was signed for Persela Lamongan to play in 2021 Menpora Cup and Liga 1 in the 2021 season. Nasir made his debut on 4 September 2021 in a match against PSIS Semarang at the Wibawa Mukti Stadium, Cikarang.

Dewa United
Nasir was signed for Dewa United to play in Liga 1 in the 2022–23 season. He made his debut on 1 October 2022 in a match against RANS Nusantara at the Indomilk Arena, Tangerang.

Career statistics

Club

Honours

Club
Arema
 Indonesia President's Cup: 2017, 2019
Persebaya Surabaya
 East Java Governor Cup: 2020

References

External links
 Nasir at Soccerway
 Nasir at Liga Indonesia

1995 births
Indonesian footballers
Living people
People from Tuban
Arema F.C. players
Persebaya Surabaya players
Persela Lamongan players
Dewa United F.C. players
Liga 1 (Indonesia) players
Association football midfielders
Sportspeople from East Java